The Mixed 3 m springboard synchro competition of the 2020 European Aquatics Championships was held on 12 May 2021.

Results
The final was started at 19:30.

References

Mixed 3 m springboard synchro
European Aquatics Championships